Varisulca was a proposed basal Podiate taxon. It encompassed several lineages of heterotrophic protists, most notably the ancyromonads (planomonads), collodictyonids (diphylleids), rigifilids (Rigifila, Micronuclearia) and mantamonadids. Recent evidence suggests that the latter three are closely related to each other, forming a clade called CRuMs, but that this is unlikely to be specifically related to ancyromonads 

Cavalier-Smith had proposed the new subphylum Varisulca which consists of the classes Hilomonadea, Diphyllatea and Glissodiscea. The validity of this proposed taxonomy has yet to ruled upon by the Society of Protistologists. It is unlikely to be widely accepted, since Varisulca appears to be paraphyletic or polyphyletic (ancyromonads are not inferred to be the sister group to CRuMs). Glissodiscea and Multirhiza (a taxon encompassing Diphyllatea and Glissodiscea) also appear paraphyletic or polyphyletic, since Mantamonas belongs to CRuMs but ancyromonads do not.

Varisulca appear to be paraphyletic stem Podiata. So the other basal Podiata such as Malawimonas, Metamonada and/or Amoebozoa and Amorphea may have emerged in the Varisulca. Some groups of Apusozoa are now considered Varisulca. The Apusomonadida (e.g. Thecamonas) now not directly associated with Varisulca but are considered sister of the opisthokonts. Sulcozoa (originally only Varisulca and Apusozoa) now encompasses the Unikonta/Amorphea and becomes equivalent to (stem) Podiata and Sarcomastigota.

Mantamonadida appear to be sister to Apusomonadida in the Apusozoa in some findings.

Taxonomy 
[Warning:  Varisulca, Multirhiza and Glissodiscea lack molecular phylogenetic support and are strongly non-monophyletic in recent studies]

Subphylum Varisulca Cavalier-Smith 2012
 Superclass Hilomonadia Cavalier-Smith 2012
 Class Hilomonadea Cavalier-Smith 2008 em. 2012
 Order Rigifilida Cavalier-Smith & Yabuki 2012
 Family Rigifilidae Cavalier-Smith & Yabuki 2012
 Genus Rigifila Cavalier-Smith & Yabuki 2012
 Family Micronucleariidae Cavalier-Smith 2008
 Genus Micronuclearia Mikrjukov & Mylnikov 2001
 Superclass Multirhiza Cavalier-Smith 2012
 Class Diphyllatea Cavalier-Smith 2003 [Anisomonadea]
 Order Diphylleida Cavalier-Smith 1993 [Collodictyonida]
 Family Sulcomonadidae Cavalier-Smith 2012
 Genus Sulcomonas Brugerolle 2006
 Family Diphylleidae Cavalier-Smith, 1993 [Collodictyonidae Brugerolle et al. 2002]
 Genus Diphylleia Massart 1920 non Michaux 1803
 Genus Collodictyon Carter 1865
 Class Glissodiscea Cavalier-Smith 2012
 Order Discocelida Cavalier-Smith 1997
 Family Discoceliidae Cavalier-Smith 2012
 Genus Discocelia Cavalier-Smith 2013 [Discocelis Vørs 1988 non Ehrenberg 1836]
 Order Mantamonadida Cavalier-Smith Glücksman et al. 2011
 Family Mantamonadidae Cavalier-Smith Glücksman et al. 2011
 Genus Mantamonas Cavalier-Smith Glücksman et al. 2011
 Order Planomonadida Cavalier-Smith 2008 (Ancyromonadida Cavalier-Smith 1998 emend. Atkins 2000)
 Family Ancyromonadidae Cavalier-Smith 1993
 Genus Ancyromonas Kent 1880
 Family Planomonadidae Cavalier-Smith 2008
 Genus Fabomonas Glücksman & Cavalier-Smith 2013
 Genus Planomonas Cavalier-Smith 2008 emend. Cavalier-Smith 2013
 Family Nutomonadidae Cavalier-Smith 2013
 Genus Nutomonas Cavalier-Smith 2013

References 

Eukaryote subphyla
Podiata